The Kim Ung-so House is the residence of yangban Kim Ung-so, located in Ryonghung Village, Ryonggang County, North Korea. Until 2002, descendants of Ung-so still lived in the house; after that date, it was rebuilt on orders of Kim Jong-il. It is now a tourist attraction.

It is listed as a National Treasure of North Korea.

References 

National Treasures of North Korea
Buildings and structures in Nampo